Teenage Dirtbags is a double-disc compilation album that was released in the United Kingdom on August 19, 2013, on CD and downloadable formats. Teenage Dirtbags is the first compilation album of the Teenage Dirtbags series. The album takes its name from the Wheatus song "Teenage Dirtbag", which is also included on the compilation album. It features popular charted songs from the pop punk era of the late 1990s and early 2000s, from such artists as Blink-182, Sum 41, The Bloodhound Gang, +44 and Less Than Jake.

Track list

CD 1

CD 2

References

2013 compilation albums
Punk rock compilation albums